An airborne observatory is an airplane, airship, or balloon with an astronomical telescope. By carrying the telescope to a sufficiently high altitude, the telescope can avoid cloud cover, pollution, and carry out observations in the infrared spectrum, above water vapor in the atmosphere which absorbs infrared radiation. Some drawbacks to this approach are the instability of the lifting platform, the weight restrictions on the instrument, the need to safely recover the gear afterward, and the cost compared to a comparable ground-based observatory.

History

Balloon-borne telescopes have been used for observation from the stratosphere since the Stratoscope I was launched in 1957. A number of different instruments have since been carried aloft by balloons for observation in the infrared, microwave, X-ray and gamma ray bands. The BOOMERanG experiment, flown between 1997–2003, and the MAXIMA, which made flights in 1998 and 1999, were used to map the Cosmic Microwave Background Radiation.

In 1965, a USA military Boeing NC-135 flying laboratory performed its first solar eclipse observing mission. The aircraft was used also for other airborne astronomy missions in a scientific program continuing until 1975. Solar eclipse missions continued until 1980.

In 1973, the French Concorde prototype, c/n 001, was modified with roof-top portholes for a solar eclipse observation mission of 30 June 1973, at the end of the French testing programme. Observational instruments were installed on board, and the aircraft flew across Africa for 74 minutes. The airplane is now at the Le Bourget Air and Space Museum on permanent display in eclipse livery, with the portholes displayed.

The Kuiper Airborne Observatory, first flown in 1974, consisted of a  aperture Cassegrain reflector carried aloft on a C-141A jet transport to perform infrared observations. In terms of aperture, the largest aircraft-borne instrument to date is a  reflector telescope carried by a modified Boeing 747 for the Stratospheric Observatory for Infrared Astronomy (SOFIA) project. This instrument was put into use for astronomical observation in 2010. On 29 June 2015, the dwarf planet Pluto passed between a distant star and the Earth producing a shadow on the Earth near New Zealand that allowed SOFIA to study the atmosphere of Pluto.

List of specially-built airborne observatories

Airplane-based observatories

Balloon-based observatory
NASA is planning the largest ever balloon observatory in 2020 with a 400 foot balloon and 2.5 metre telescope.  ASTHROS (Astrophysics Stratospheric Telescope for High Spectral Resolution Observations at Submillimeter-wavelengths) will launch from the Antarctic and is envisioned to last three weeks.

See also
 Observatory
 Space telescope
 Timeline of telescopes, observatories, and observing technology
 Aerospace architecture

References